"Stuck In My Head" is a song by Norwegian singer Tone Damli from her fourth studio album Cocool (2010), featuring Norwegian rapper Vinni. It was released in Norway on 27 April 2011. The song peaked at number 2 on the Norwegian Singles Chart.

Music video
A music video to accompany the release of "Stuck In My Head" was first released onto YouTube on 29 November 2010 at a total length of three minutes and sixteen seconds.

Track listing

Chart performance

Release history

References

2010 songs
Tone Damli songs
2011 singles